Eugenia phillyraeoides is a species of plant in the family Myrtaceae. It is endemic to Sri Lanka.

References

phillyraeoides
Flora of Sri Lanka
Taxonomy articles created by Polbot
Taxobox binomials not recognized by IUCN